Zamora is a municipality in Falcón State, Venezuela.

Name
The municipality is one of several named "Zamora Municipality" for the 19th century Venezuelan soldier Ezequiel Zamora.

Municipalities of Falcón